The Horserace Betting and Olympic Lottery Act 2004 (c 25) is an Act of the Parliament of the United Kingdom.

Section 40 - Commencement
The following orders have been made under this section:
The Horserace Betting and Olympic Lottery Act 2004 (Commencement No. 1) Order 2004 (S.I. 2004/3283 (C. 149))
The Horserace Betting and Olympic Lottery Act 2004 (Commencement No. 2) Order 2005 (S.I. 2005/1134 (C. 52))
The Horserace Betting and Olympic Lottery Act 2004 (Commencement No. 3) Order 2005 (S.I. 2005/1831 (C. 78))
The Horserace Betting and Olympic Lottery Act 2004 (Commencement No. 4) Order 2011 (S.I. 2011/462 (C. 17))

References
Halsbury's Statutes,

External links
The Horserace Betting and Olympic Lottery Act 2004, as amended from the National Archives.
The Horserace Betting and Olympic Lottery Act 2004, as originally enacted from the National Archives.
Explanatory notes to the Horserace Betting and Olympic Lottery Act 2004.

United Kingdom Acts of Parliament 2004